Hindsholm is a peninsula forming the north-eastern extremity of the Danish island of Funen. It is bound to the south by the Kerteminde Fjord but linked to the rest of the island in the south-west. It belongs to Kerteminde municipality.

Peninsulas of Funen
Peninsulas of the Baltic Sea